An Ozark Odyssey is an autobiographical memoir written by Pulitzer Prize nominee William Childress. The book tells the story of Childress' turbulent childhood and youth in the American Ozarks, his relationship with his stoic stepfather Jay Childress, and his journey into adulthood.

The book was published in 2006 by Southern Illinois University Press.

External links
 An Ozark Odyssey at Amazon.com (hardcover edition)

2006 non-fiction books
American memoirs
Ozarks